Karolina Zakrzewska is a beauty pageant contestant who represented Poland in Miss World 2007 in China.  She studied language and communication science.

References

Miss World 2007 delegates
1986 births
Living people
Polish beauty pageant winners
People from Zielona Góra